Pascal Roller (born 20 November 1976) is a German former professional basketball player. At a height of 1.80 m (5'11") and a weight of 81 kg (180 pounds), he played at the point guard position.

Professional career 
Roller spent most of his pro career with the Deutsche Bank Skyliners of the German League.

Clubs

German national team 
Internationally, Roller represented the senior German national team at several big FIBA tournaments.

Awards and accomplishments

Individual 
2x All-German League Team: (2005, 2006)
7x German League All-Star
German League MVP: (2004)
122 caps with the senior German national team
German select team at the Nike Hoop Heroes Tour (1997)

Club 

German League champion (2004)
German Cup winner (2000)

German national team 

2002 FIBA World Championship: 
2005 EuroBasket:

References

External links 
 2006 interview with Roller hoopsaddict.com

1976 births
Living people
Basketball players at the 2008 Summer Olympics
German men's basketball players
Olympic basketball players of Germany
Pallacanestro Biella players
Point guards
Skyliners Frankfurt players
Tigers Tübingen players
2006 FIBA World Championship players
2002 FIBA World Championship players
Sportspeople from Heidelberg